Quddus Khojamyarov (also transliterated as Kuddus Kuzhamyarov; ; May 21, 1918 — April 8, 1994) was a Uyghur Soviet composer from Kazakhstan. He was named a People's Artist of the USSR.

He is best known for his Muqam melodies, often composing in 12 muqams. Notable compositions include Nazugum, regarded as the first Uyghur opera, Zolotyegorye (The Golden Mountains) (1960) and his Taklimakan symphony.

Biography
Kuzhamyarov was born on May 21, 1918, in the modern village of Kaynazar in Enbekshikazakh District, Almaty Region, Kazakhstan. His father died when he was just 3 months old. From a young age he was distinguished by discipline, commitment, lack of youthful frivolity and common weaknesses. He did not smoke, drink and was innocent of the temptations in life. Kuzhamyarov was admitted to the College of Music and Drama in Alma-Ata, despite not yet being 16 years old. First he went to college studying the violin, then switched to the piano, where he began composing music. He passed the examinations for the composition faculty of the Moscow Conservatory. However, due to World War II he had to postpone his studies; he was drafted into the army. In 1943, he joined the Communist Party.

After demobilization, he returned to Alma-Ata and in 1951 he graduated from the Alma-Ata Conservatory, under professor Yevgeny Brusilovsky, who cited Kuzhamyarov as a very important Uyghur musician. He finally left Alma-Ata and attended the Moscow Conservatory in the class of Professor V. Shebalin from 1953. He taught in the years 1957–1967 years and became rector of the Alma-Ata State Conservatory in 1968, receiving the title of professor in 1965.

He is credited with creating the first Uyghur opera Nazugum (1956), Zolotyegorye (The Golden Mountains) (1960) and the ballet "Chin Tomur" (1967). The originality of the author's handwriting, is indicated in the search for national identity, embodied in a program of symphonic poem "Rizvana" (1950), for which he received the Stalin Prize of the third degree in 1951. He composed many chamber, instrumental and choral works, songs and ballads and music for dramatic productions. Strongly interested in the history of the Xinjiang region, he also wrote the Taklimakan symphony which according to him is "an expression of... the irrigation and cultivation of the desert", its disappearance by sandstorm and then "a foreshadowing of the future, in which the flourishing past will return."

He was a member of the Union of Composers of Kazakhstan and from 1955-1959 was its chairman. In the years 1959-1966 he was a member of the Committee on Lenin and USSR State Prize in Literature and Art. He was a participant in international festivals in Tehran in 1961 and Baghdad in 1964. He was elected a member of the Communist Party of the Kazakh SSR (1961–1967).

Towards the end of his life he composed a "Children's Album" consisting of 15 piano pieces based on his childhood memories and other lyrical works. In 1992, he lectured in the art college in Ürümqi, Xinjiang, China on Muqum music.

Honours and awards
Order of Lenin
Medal "For the Victory over Germany in the Great Patriotic War 1941–1945"
Order of the Badge of Honour
Order of the Red Banner of Labour
Order of the October Revolution
Medal "Veteran of Labour"
People's Artist of the Kazakh SSR
People's Artist of the USSR
Stalin Prize

References

Uighur Music
Biographical information (in Russian)

1918 births
1994 deaths
20th-century classical musicians
20th-century composers
20th-century Kazakhstani musicians
20th-century male musicians
People from Almaty Region
Communist Party of the Soviet Union members
People's Artists of the USSR
Stalin Prize winners
Recipients of the Order of Lenin
Recipients of the Order of the Red Banner of Labour
Ballet composers
Uyghur people
Uyghur music
Kazakhstani classical composers
Kazakhstani communists
Kazakhstani male musicians
Kazakhstani opera composers
Kazakhstani people of Uyghur descent
Soviet male classical composers
Soviet military personnel of World War II
Soviet music educators
Soviet opera composers